Hemidactylus modestus, also known as the moderate leaf-toed gecko or Tana River gecko, is a species of gecko. It is endemic to Kenya.

References

Hemidactylus
Reptiles of Kenya
Endemic fauna of Kenya
Reptiles described in 1894
Taxa named by Albert Günther